Malchevskaya is a rural locality (a village) in Nyuksenskoye Rural Settlement, Nyuksensky District, Vologda Oblast, Russia. The population was 32 as of 2002.

Geography 
Malchevskaya is located 15 km northwest of Nyuksenitsa (the district's administrative centre) by road. Semenova Gora is the nearest rural locality.

References 

Rural localities in Nyuksensky District